Asura eichhorni is a moth of the family Erebidae. It is found in New Guinea.

References

eichhorni
Moths described in 1936
Moths of New Guinea